Kyebando is a neighborhood within Kampala, the capital and largest city in Uganda.

Location
Kyebando is bordered by Kawempe to the northwest, Kikaaya to the northeast, Bukoto to the east, Mulago to the south, Bwaise to the southwest and Kaleerwe to the west. The coordinates of Kyebando are:0°21'22.0"N, 32°34'48.0"E (Latitude:0.356111; Longitude:32.580000).

Overview
The base of the hill is a ring road, Kyebando Ring Road that makes a near-complete circle through the neighborhood. The hill and surrounding area is dotted with school, interspersed with low income residential houses. During the 2000s, numerous educational institutions have sprung up in the neighborhood. The rapid urbanization brings with it, strained public services and increased crime levels.

Points of interest
 Kampala Model Primary School - A mixed, non-residential elementary school
 St.Stephen Day & Boarding Primary School - A private, mixed, day and residential elementary school
 St. Paul Primary School - An a mixed, day, elementary school, affiliated with St. Paul's Church Kyebando, a Church of Uganda institution.
 City View College - A private, mixed, non-residential secondary school
 City Side College Makerere - Another private secondary college
 Kampala Hill Academy
 Millennium College School
 St.Thomas Aquinas, Kyebando - A place of worship, affiliated with the Roman Catholic Archdiocese of Kampala
 St. Paul's Church of Uganda, Kyebando - A place of worship, affiliated with the Church of Uganda
 Kyebando Baptist Church - A place of worship affiliated with the Baptist Church
 Busanza Infants & Primary School - on late Paulo Semakula Road.

Other points of interest
 Feel Home Restaurant
 Brimax Pub
 Shinners Pub
 Centenary Car Park
 The offices of Action to Support Orphans & Disadvantaged, an NGO.

See also

References

External links
  Kyebando, Home of Kampala’s Beggars

Neighborhoods of Kampala
Cities in the Great Rift Valley
Kawempe Division